Jeremiah is a male given name meaning " will raise", or "God is high", and having its origin in ancient Hebrew. Jeremias is a form that it takes in some Romance languages. Jeremiah is sometimes an anglicised form of the Irish Diarmaid, while "Jeremy" is the anglicized of "Jeremiah" in the English language.

The name takes its popularity from the Hebrew prophet Jeremiah.

Those bearing the name include:

Politicians
Jeremiah S. Bacon (1858-1939), American politician
Jeremiah Beveridge (1862–1927), American historian and politician
Jeremiah S. Black (1810–1883), American judge and politician
Jeremiah Gates Brainard (c. 1759–1830), Justice of the Connecticut Supreme Court
Jeremiah Brown (politician) (1785–1858), American politician
Jeremiah Clemens (1814–1865), American novelist and politician
Jeremiah Jones Colbath (1812–1875), American politician
Jeremiah Denton (1924–2014), US Senator and naval officer
Jeremiah T. Mahoney (1878–1970), American judge
Jeremiah Mason (1768–1848), American politician
Jeremiah Morrow (1771–1852), American politician
Jeremiah Nelson (1769–1838), American politician
Jeremiah O'Brien (Maine politician) (1778–1858), American politician
Jeremiah O'Donovan "Rossa" (1831–1915), Fenian conspirator
Jeremiah McLain Rusk (1830–1893), American politician
Jeremiah Wadsworth (1743–1804), American merchant and politician

In religion
Historic
Jeremiah (c. 655-586 BCE), Jewish religious leader
 Jeremiah (I), a first-generation Amora sage of the Land of Israel
 Jeremiah bar Abba (fl. 3rd century), a second-generation Amora sage of the Land of Israel 
 Jeremiah (II), a third-generation Amora sage of the Land of Israel
 Jeremiah (III), a fourth-generation Amora sage of the Land of Israel
Jeremiah (Bulgarian priest), a 10th century priest
Patriarch Jeremias I of Constantinople (fl. early 16th century, died 1546), Balkan-born religious leader
Patriarch Jeremias II of Constantinople (c. 1530–1595), Greek religious leader
Patriarch Jeremias III of Constantinople (1650s-1735), Greek religious leader
Contemporary
Jeremiah Evarts (1781–1831), American missionary
Jeremiah Wright (born 1941), American pastor

Musicians
Jeremiah Birnbaum (born 1978), American singer-songwriter
Jeremiah Clarke (1674–1707), English composer
Jeremiah Green (1977–2022), American musician

In sports
Jeremiah Baisako (born 1980), Namibian football player
Jeremiah Castille (born 1961), American football player
Jeremiah Hall (born 1998), American football player
Jeremiah Kelly (1900–1962), Scottish footballer
Jeremiah Kolone (born 1994), Samoan-American football player
Jeremiah Ledbetter (born 1994), American football player
Jeremiah Masoli (born 1988), American football player
Jeremiah Massey (born 1982), American basketball player
Jeremiah Mordi (born 1993), Nigerian basketball player
Jeremiah Owusu-Koramoah (born 1999), American football player
Jeremiah Poutasi (born 1994), American football player
Jeremiah Robinson (fl. c. 1930), Irish football player
Jeremiah Sirles (born 1991), American football player
Jeremiah Trotter (born 1977), American football player

Others
Jeremiah Boyle (1818–1871), American general
Jeremiah Curtin (1835–1906), American translator
Jeremiah Day (1773–1867), American academic
Jeremiah Dixon (1733–1779), English surveyor
Jeremiah Horrocks (1618–1641), English astronomer
Jeremiah O'Brien (1744–1818), American naval captain
Jeremiah Smith (lawyer) (1759–1842), American jurist and state governor
Jeremiah Smith (Royal Navy officer) (died 1675), English naval officer
Jeremiah Tower (born 1942), American chef
Jeremiah Massillon (born 2007), American musician and professional video game player

Fictional entities
 Jeremiah Arkham, in the Batman franchise
 Jeremiah Cloutier, in the American television series Oz
 Jeremiah Collins, in the American television series Dark Shadows
 Jeremiah Danvers, Kara Danvers/Supergirl's foster father in Supergirl
 Jeremiah Gottwald, in the anime Code Geass
 Jeremiah Johnson, the title character of the 1972 film of the same name
 Jeremiah MacKenzie, a character in Outlander
 Jeremiah Otto, a character in Fear the Walking Dead
 Jeremiah Peabody, a maker of green and purple pills in a song
 Jeremiah Smith, in the television series The X-Files
 Jeremiah Surd, in the television series The Real Adventures of Jonny Quest

Hebrew masculine given names
Jewish masculine given names
Modern names of Hebrew origin